The Phantom Father is a 2011 Romanian drama film directed by Lucian Georgescu. The film premiered at the 2011 Montreal World Film Festival.

Cast 
 Marcel Iureș as Robert Traum
 Mihaela Sîrbu as Tanya
  as Sami
  as Mayor Codrescu
 Mimi Brănescu as Alex
 Victor Rebengiuc as Uncle Petre
 Barry Gifford as Jack

References

External links 

2011 drama films
2011 films
Romanian drama films